William F. Tate IV is an African-American social scientist and higher education administrator. In May 2021, he was selected as president of the Louisiana State University system, and chancellor of the flagship school in Baton Rouge. He is the first Black person to hold the position(s), and the first to head any school in the Southeastern athletics conference.

Career 
At the time of his acceptance of the LSU position, he was serving as Provost and Executive Vice President of Academic Affairs at the University of South Carolina, where he is also USC Education Foundation Distinguished Professor with appointments in Sociology, Family and Preventive Medicine, and Epidemiology & Biostatistics. 

He previously served as dean and vice provost for graduate education and held the Edward Mallinckrodt Distinguished University Professorship in Arts & Sciences at Washington University in St. Louis. He also held the William L. and Betty F. Adams Chair at Texas Christian University and served on the faculty at the University of Wisconsin-Madison. 

He is a fellow and past president of the American Educational Research Association, and was elected a member of the National Academy of Education in 2016.

Tate co-authored numerous mathematics textbooks including Silver Burdett Ginn Mathematics, Scott Foresman-Addison Wesley Mathematics, Scott Foresman Science, and Scott Foresman-Addison Wesley enVisionMATH, and enVisionMATH Common Core.

Personal life 
Tate was raised Catholic and is married to Kim Cash Tate, a popular Protestant YouTuber, singer, speaker, and writer. In 2015, Tate described his faith during a Veritas Forum event.

References

External links
Faculty page

Living people
University of South Carolina faculty
Washington University in St. Louis faculty
Texas Christian University faculty
University of Wisconsin–Madison faculty
Educational research
American sociologists
Northern Illinois University alumni
University of Texas at Dallas alumni
Washington University School of Medicine alumni
University of Maryland, College Park alumni
Year of birth missing (living people)

African-American Catholics